Howell-North Books was a book publishing company based in Berkeley, California. They specialized in American history, in particular railroadiana, the American West, and nautical history. They were active from at least 1959 to 1981.

Select Bibliography
Mansions on Rails: The Folklore of the Private Rail Car, Lucius Beebe (1959)
Eight Immortal Flavors: Secrets of Cantonese Cookery from San Francisco's Chinatown, Johnny Kan and Charles L. Leong. (1963)
The Thousand Mile Summer, Colin Fletcher (1964)
 Snowplow: Clearing Mountain Rails'', Gerald M. Best (1966)

References

Defunct book publishing companies of the United States
History of transportation in the United States
Western United States
Book publishing companies based in Berkeley, California
Publishing companies established in 1959